Pointe du Vallonnet is a mountain of Savoie, France, close to the Italian border. It lies in the Massif de la Vanoise range, and is part of the French Alps. It has an elevation of 3,372 meters (11,060 feet) above sea level.

References

Alpine three-thousanders
Mountains of the Alps
Mountains of Savoie